Antonio Ordelaffi is the name of:

Antonio I Ordelaffi (1390–1448), lord of Forlì
Antonio II Ordelaffi (1460–1504), see Cesare Borgia